"Mr. Bevis" is episode thirty-three of the American television anthology series The Twilight Zone. It first aired on June 3, 1960 on CBS. This episode is one of only four to feature the "blinking eye" opening sequence, and the first to feature the opening narration which would be used (with minor changes) for every episode throughout season 2 and 3. The episode was an unsuccessful television pilot.

Opening narration

The narration continues when Bevis walks up to his car.

Plot

Mr. Bevis loses his job, gets tickets on his car (which inadvertently hooks bumpers with another vehicle and, once pulled away, flips over), and gets evicted from his apartment – all in one day. Bevis then meets and gets assistance from his guardian angel, one J. Hardy Hempstead. Bevis gets to start the day over again, but there is a catch: in order to continue in his new life, Bevis must make some changes, including no strange clothes, no loud zither music, in effect no longer the well-liked neighborhood goofball.

He accepts, and the first thing he notices is that his personal transportation is now an Austin-Healey sportscar instead of his previous jalopy, a soot-spewing 1924 Rickenbacker. He later discovers that he is a success at work, and his rent is paid. As the day goes on, he realizes that all of his eccentricities, and the affection from his fellow citizens, were the things that make him happy. Bevis asks that things be returned to the way they were. Hempstead obliges, initially warning Bevis that he will still have no job, car, or apartment. However, perhaps moved by the warmth people have for Bevis, and the man's genuine kindness, the angel arranges for him to get his old jalopy back.

Later, Mr. Bevis is shown finishing his fifth shot of whiskey, and he pays his total tab of $5.00 with one bill. He then leaves the bar, and finds his Rickenbacker is parked in front of a fire hydrant. When Bevis is about to be ticketed for this infraction, the hydrant suddenly disappears and reappears next to the officer's motorcycle. "J. Hardy Hempstead" is still watching over Bevis.

Closing narration

References

Further reading
DeVoe, Bill. (2008). Trivia from The Twilight Zone. Albany, GA: Bear Manor Media. 
Grams, Martin. (2008). The Twilight Zone: Unlocking the Door to a Television Classic. Churchville, MD: OTR Publishing.

External links
 

1960 American television episodes
The Twilight Zone (1959 TV series season 1) episodes
Television pilots within series
Television pilots not picked up as a series
Television episodes about termination of employment
Television episodes written by Rod Serling